The 1999 Southampton Council election took place on 6 May 1999 to elect members of Southampton Unitary Council in Hampshire, England. One third of the council was up for election and the Labour party stayed in overall control of the council.

After the election, the composition of the council was
Labour 27
Liberal Democrat 14
Conservative 4

Election result
The results saw the Labour party stay in control of the council after holding all but one of the seats they had been defending. The only change came in St Lukes ward where Conservative Conor Burns gained the seat from Labour. Overall turnout in the election was 26.4%.

Ward results

References

1999 English local elections
1999
1990s in Southampton